The Offenders is a 1921 American melodrama film directed by Fenwicke L. Holmes. Margery Wilson, the co-star, reportedly co-directed this and two other films between 1921 and 1924.

The film is frequently mis-dated, either as being released in 1922 or 1924. Contemporary documentation states that it was made in the summer of 1921 and released that November. It was filmed in the town of Randolph, Vermont, with various locals acting as extras. Little else is known about the film, which is suspected to be lost.

What is known is limited to the archives kept in the Chandler Theatre in Randolph (which showed the movie) and the newspaper records of the day. At that time, the newspaper in Randolph was The Herald and Times, which is now just The Herald.

Cast
Margery Wilson
Percy Helton

Plot
A girl (Wilson) is held at mercy of gang of crooks, her only friend being a "half-wit". A murder is committed and blame shifted to the girl.

The "half-wit" has seen the murder, but cannot remember. When he is cured, his testimony frees the girl.

See also
 List of films in the public domain in the United States
 List of lost films

References

External links
 
 New York Times review

1921 films
American silent feature films
American black-and-white films
Lost American films
Randolph, Vermont
1921 drama films
Silent American drama films
Melodrama films
1921 lost films
Lost drama films
1920s American films